La Vida Bohème is a rock band from Caracas, Venezuela, formed by Rafael Perez, Daniel De Sousa, Sebastian Ayala, and Henry D'Arthenay in late 2006 and mid-2007. The band takes influence from late '80s punk, disco, funk, electronic music, jazz, salsa, reggae and dance music. Their first recording is a self-titled EP that includes three songs (Aprendiendo.a.apagar.un.cigarro.con.los.pies, Luz and I.p.o.s.t.e.l.)

La Vida Bohéme is Henry D’Arthenay (guitar and lead singer), Daniel Briceño (bass guitar and vocals), Daniel de Sousa (guitar and vocals), and Sebastián Ayala (drummer and vocals).

They won the "Festival de Nuevas Bandas" (New Bands Festival of Venezuela) in 2008.

They released Nuestra, their 12-track debut album in February 2010. The album was available for free download for a limited time, followed by a limited-edition CD pressing in the summer of 2010. The album has been licensed by Nacional Records for release in North America in 2011. Their first single was "Radio Capital", a danceable tune anchored by a repetitive chant of "Gabba Gabba Hey", referencing The Ramones. They were widely acclaimed for their debut album, earning them a Grammy nomination and two Latin Grammy wins. Their song "Buen Salvaje" is featured in the EA Sports game FIFA 12, "Radio Capital" is featured in Grand Theft Auto V, and "Manos Arriba" is featured in FIFA 21.

History
The band's name was chosen by the first drummer while they practiced in downtown Caracas. It has no particular origin, though it is said they chose it from Giacomo Puccini's opera La bohème.

During 2007 they showed their music through the local night life and festivals. Their first EP, La Vida Bohème EP, with three songs, is available for download on the netlabel Fanzinatra.

Their debut album, Nuestra was recorded and produced in Venezuela by Rudy Pagliuca (guitarist of Malanga) and mixed by Leonel Carmona and mastered in Argentina by Andrés Mayo. It is one of the first albums in Venezuela to be released on free download, through the record company All of The Above. A limited-edition CD was released in the summer of 2010 and sold directly by the band at shows or other events.

The band has signed a licensing deal with Nacional Records, which will distribute Nuestra in USA, Canada and Mexico.

The band has also produced videos for two of the album's singles: "Radio Capital", which was released in December 2009, and "Danz!", released in August 2010. In November 2010, YouTube censored the video for "Danz!", citing the video's inclusion of nudity.

In September 2011, the band received two Latin Grammy nominations from Latin Recording Academy. "Nuestra" was nominated for Best Rock Album and "Radio Capital" was nominated for Best Rock Song. In November 2011, "Nuestra" was nominated for a Grammy Award for Best Latin Pop, Rock or Urban Album.

They finished the recording process for their second studio album, Será in February 2013; it was released on May 14. In November 2013, La Vida Boheme won their first Latin Grammy Award for Best Rock Album. They were named Best Rock Artist at the 2014 Pepsi Venezuela Music Awards.

Their 3rd album "La Lucha", produced by Eduardo Cabra Martínez (Visitante Calle 13) and recorded in Puerto Rico, was released in March 2017. "La Lucha" marks the end of the band's album trilogy; "Nuestra Sera La Lucha", which roughly translates to "Ours Will Be The Fight".

In 2020 they came out with their first single since “La Lucha” called “Último Round”, a few months later their song “Acción o decreto de guerra a muerte contra los traidores del rock latinoamericano” came out with a completely different sound to it, some months later came “¡Plis, Plis, Plis!” and “Miami S&M”, the last song of the year was called “Control” and wrapped up the new 2020 album which was named “Fr€€$$r”. This album is characterised by having videos for every one of its songs.

Members
 Henry D'Arthenay (Guitar, Vocals, Electronics) (2006–present)
 Daniel de Sousa  (Guitar, Cow bell, Backing Vocals, Synths) (2006–present)
 Sebastián Ayala (Drummer, Backing Vocals, Programming) (2007–present)
 Daniel "Mono" Briceño (Bass guitar, Synths, Backing Vocals) (2017–present)

Past members
 Rafael Pérez Medina (Bass guitar, Backing Vocals) (2006-2017)
 Moises Enghelberg (Drummer) (2006)

Discography

Studio albums 

 Nuestra (2010)
 Será (2013)
 La Lucha (2017)
 Caribe Caribe (2023)

EPs 

 La Vida Bohème (2007)
 Tiempo Compartido (2020)
 FR€€​$​$​R (2020)
 TITULARES (2022)

References

External links
 MTV IGGY Best New Band Concert 2011 with La Vida Boheme Performance
 La Vida Boheme Documentary
 
 
 
 
 "Flamingo" on YouTube

Musical groups established in 2006
Venezuelan rock music groups
Nacional Records artists